"Superman's Song" is the first single of Canadian folk-rock group Crash Test Dummies, appearing on their 1991 debut album The Ghosts That Haunt Me. The single was the group's first hit, reaching number four in Canada, number 56 in the United States and number 87 in Australia. It was featured in the pilot of the Canadian TV series Due South.

The song was covered by Lucy Wainwright Roche, daughter of Loudon Wainwright III and Suzzy Roche of The Roches, on her second EP 8 More. It also has been covered by Nataly Dawn.

Meaning
Brad Roberts has stated that "Superman's Song" is an "analysis of political philosophy" and that the way the song was written alleviated some of the seriousness of the topic. He explained the meaning of the song in a 1992 interview:

"Superman as cast in "Superman's Song" is obviously a left-wing political figure. His activity in the community is intrinsic to his being. Superman is being juxtaposed against Tarzan, who is kind of a laissez-faire capitalist type who retreats to the forest, and rejects the idea of community. He wants to live in a so-called animal state, and he doesn't have to be bothered with any kind of political realities."

Music video

The music video for the song was directed by Dale Heslip and features the band singing at a funeral for Superman attended by various aging superheroes. Some depicted are a middle-aged Wonder Woman-like character, The Green Hornet, and possibly Green Lantern (Alan Scott). It won the MuchMusic Video Award for Best Video in 1991.

Charts

Weekly charts

Year-end charts

References

1991 debut singles
1991 songs
Arista Records singles
Crash Test Dummies songs
Rock ballads
Songs about fictional male characters
Songs written by Brad Roberts
Superman music